Ariella Hernandez Arida (born November 20, 1988), also known as Ara Arida, is a Filipino actress, model, and beauty pageant titleholder who was crowned Miss Universe Philippines 2013. She represented the Philippines at the Miss Universe 2013 competition and placed 3rd Runner-Up.

Early life and education
Ariella Hernandez Arida was born in Alaminos, Laguna, Philippines to academics Arlesito Arida of Alaminos, and Estella Arida (née Hernandez) of San Pablo. She is a graduate of the University of the Philippines Los Baños with a degree in chemistry. Prior to winning the title, Arida competed at Miss Philippines Earth 2012 and was a former Binibining Laguna contestant. She is a member of Iglesia ni Cristo.

Pageantry

Miss Philippines Earth 2012

Arida competed at the Miss Philippines Earth 2012 pageant but was unplaced. Stephany Stefanowitz won the said pageant.

Binibining Pilipinas 2013

In 2013, Arida joined the 50th edition of the Binibining Pilipinas pageant. During the question and answer portion, she was asked: "Name a lesson about life that women can teach men.” She responded:
"One lesson in life that women can teach men is being sensitive because we all know that men are more logical when it comes to decision[-making]. They’re usually more rational, straightforward. Unlike we women, we use our hearts and tend to get emotional in some of our decisions. So, that’s it for me. Sensitivity is something that we, women, can teach to men. Thank you."

At the end of the event, Arida was crowned Miss Universe Philippines 2013 by Miss Universe Philippines 2012 and Miss Universe 2012 First Runner-up, Janine Tugonon and garnered the award for Best in Swimsuit at the Binibining Pilipinas 2013 pageant held in the Smart Araneta Coliseum on April 14, 2013. She was crowned along with Binibining Pilipinas International 2013 and Miss International 2013, Bea Rose Santiago; Binibining Pilipinas Tourism 2013, Joanna Cindy Miranda; Binibining Pilipinas Supranational 2013 and Miss Supranational 2013, Mutya Johanna Datul and 1st Runner-up, Pia Wurtzbach.

On March 30, 2014, Arida crowned Mary Jean Lastimosa as her successor at the Binibining Pilipinas 2014 pageant held at the Smart Araneta Coliseum in Quezon City, Philippines.

Miss Universe 2013

She represented the Philippines at the Miss Universe 2013 pageant at the Crocus City Hall in Moscow, Russia on November 9, 2013
where she won the 16th spot in the semifinals via the online vote. She also bagged the Ice Princess award in the winter-themed glam shot competition.

During the question and answer portion, she was asked: "What can be done about the lack of jobs for young people starting their careers around the world?" She responded:
"For the people who have lack of jobs, I do believe that we people should invest in education and that is my primary advocacy, because we all know that if everyone of us is educated and well aware of what we are doing, we could land into jobs and we could land a good career in the future. Education is the primary source and ticket to a better future."

By the end of the event, Arida finished as 3rd Runner-Up to Gabriela Isler of Venezuela. Philippines placed in the Top 5 for the 4th consecutive year. Arida was also the only delegate representing an Asian country to place in the Top 5.

Filmography

Film

Television

References

External links

1988 births
Living people
Binibining Pilipinas winners
Filipino female models
Filipino television personalities
People from Laguna (province)
Miss Universe 2013 contestants
Miss Philippines Earth contestants
GMA Network personalities
ABS-CBN personalities
Star Magic personalities
University of the Philippines Los Baños alumni
Members of Iglesia ni Cristo